Events from the year 1617 in Ireland.

Incumbent
Monarch: James I

Events
 May 8 – title of Baron Hamilton of Strabane in the County of Tyrone created in the Peerage of Ireland for the 13-year-old James Hamilton, Master of Abercorn.
 June – Contention of the bards: Teige MacDaire in a letter to Lughaidh Ó Cléirigh and the northern poets proposes a decisive face-to-face poetic disputation.
 August 19 – Sir Walter Ralegh's last expedition sets out from Cork to cross to South America.
 October 17 – proclamation ordering banishment of Roman Catholic priests educated abroad.
 The De Barry family moves from Barryscourt Castle near Carrigtwohill to Barrymore Castle in Castlelyons.
 Barnabe Rich publishes The Irish Hubbub, or the English Hue and Crie.

Births
approx. date
Roger Boyle, Church of Ireland bishop (d. 1687)
Hezekiah Holland ('Anglo-Hibernus'), Anglican clergyman (d. after 1660)

Deaths
January 29 – William Butler, alchemist (b. c.1534)
April 10 – David de Barry, 5th Viscount Buttevant, peer
November 10 – Barnabe Rich, English soldier and writer (b. c.1540)
Aonghus Ruadh na nAor Ó Dálaigh, poet (b. 1550) (murdered)
Eochaidh Ó hÉoghusa, poet (b. 1567)

References

 
1610s in Ireland
Ireland
Years of the 17th century in Ireland